Glavina is a Croatian surname that may refer to

Andrei Glavina (1881–1925), Istro-Romanian writer
Denis Glavina (born 1986), Croatian footballer
Dominik Glavina (born 1992), Croatian footballer
Ratko Glavina (born 1941), Croatian actor

See also
Glavin

Croatian surnames